Liberty is a town that sits astride the line dividing Okmulgee and Tulsa counties in the U.S. state of Oklahoma. The population was 220 in the 2010 United States Census, compared to the figure of 184 recorded in 2000.

History
The earliest settler recorded in this area was Wallace W. Baird, a farmer from Illinois, who arrived in Tulsa County in 1912, and settled on a  farm. Liberty was incorporated as a dispersed rural community on October 1, 1978. It incorporated a second time on June 29, 1982.

Geography
Liberty is located at  (35.857244, -95.969284).

Liberty is east of Mounds, south of both Tulsa and Glenpool, and north of both Okmulgee and Preston, directly on the east side of U.S. Route 75.

According to the United States Census Bureau, the town has a total area of 6.1 square miles (15.8 km2), all land.

Demographics

As of the 2000 American census there were 184 people, 63 households, and 52 families residing in the town. There were 72 housing units at an average density of 11.8 per square mile (4.5/km2). The racial makeup of the town was 85.33% White, 9.78% Native American, and 4.89% from two or more races.

There were 63 households, out of which 41.3% had children under the age of 18 living with them, 66.7% were married couples living together, 11.1% had a female householder with no husband present, and 15.9% were non-families. 14.3% of all households were made up of individuals, and 7.9% had someone living alone who was 65 years of age or older. The average household size was 2.92 and the average family size was 3.21.

In Liberty, the population was spread out, with 30.4% under the age of 18, 9.8% from 18 to 24, 26.1% from 25 to 44, 22.8% from 45 to 64, and 10.9% who were 65 years of age or older. The median age was 33 years. For every 100 females, there were 106.7 males. For every 100 females age 18 and over, there were 93.9 males.

The median income for a household in the town was $25,833, and the median income for a family was $35,625. Males had a median income of $30,781 versus $26,875 for females. The per capita income for the town was $12,421. About 9.4% of families and 6.5% of the population were below the poverty line, including 11.7% of those under the age of 18 and none of those 65 or over.

Economy
Agriculture has been the base of the town economy. By 2000, over 86 percent of the inhabitants commuted to work in other towns.

"Liberty Mounds"
The signs on US Route 75 pointing in the direction of Liberty east of the highway show the name as “Liberty Mounds”.  The Liberty town name was taken from the nearby Liberty School District.  Given the district's proximity to Mounds, Oklahoma on the west side of US-75, a former school superintendent referred to the district as “Liberty Mounds” to distinguish it from another Liberty school district near Morris in Okmulgee County.  So the highway signs reference the school, although both the town and the school district are actually named Liberty.

References

Further reading
Fact Sheet, Liberty town, Oklahoma. (accessed February 9, 2007)
Census Place Map, Okmulgee County, Oklahoma. (accessed February 9, 2007)
Census Place Map 4, Tulsa County, Oklahoma. (accessed February 9, 2007)

Towns in Okmulgee County, Oklahoma
Towns in Tulsa County, Oklahoma
Towns in Oklahoma
Populated places established in 1912
1912 establishments in Oklahoma